Angela Hall (born 8 October 1958) is a former association football goalkeeper who represented New Zealand at international level.

Hall made her Football Ferns in a 1–1 draw with Australia on 21 May 1980, and finished her international career with 15 caps to her credit.

References

1958 births
Living people
New Zealand women's international footballers
New Zealand women's association footballers
Women's association football goalkeepers